Pedro Romo is a Mexican prolific actor and comedian (born June 17, 1957). He is known mostly for his roles as Don Filemon in the sitcom Skimo, and Pedro in the La risa en vacaciones film series.

Filmography

Television work 
Romo has starred and guest starred in many sitcoms such as Skimo, Vecinos and Yo amo a Juan Querendón, and dramas such as Abrázame muy fuerte and Por tu Amor just to name a few.

External links

1957 births
Living people
20th-century Mexican male actors
21st-century Mexican male actors
Mexican male comedians
Mexican male film actors
Mexican male telenovela actors
Mexican male television actors